The Vic Batchelder Memorial Award is an annual British ice hockey award made to the young British player of the year as voted for by members of Ice Hockey Journalists UK. The award was first made in 2004.

The award is named in honour of Vic Batchelder who was the editor of the now defunct Ice Hockey News Review magazine. Vic Batchelder died in 2001 at the age of 61.

Past winners

See also
Man of Ice Awards

References

British ice hockey trophies and awards
Ice Hockey Journalists UK
Awards established in 2004
2004 establishments in the United Kingdom
Annual events in the United Kingdom